An independent or non-partisan politician is a politician not affiliated with any political party or bureaucratic association. There are numerous reasons why someone may stand for office as an independent.

Some politicians have political views that do not align with the platforms of any political party, and therefore choose not to affiliate with them. Some independent politicians may be associated with a party, perhaps as former members of it, or else have views that align with it, but choose not to stand in its name, or are unable to do so because the party in question has selected another candidate. Others may belong to or support a political party at the national level but believe they should not formally represent it (and thus be subject to its policies) at another level.

In running for public office, independents sometimes choose to form a party or alliance with other independents, and may formally register their party or alliance. Even where the word "independent" is used, such alliances have much in common with a political party, especially if there is an organization which needs to approve the "independent" candidates.

Americas

Brazil
Independent politicians are not allowed to run for office in Brazil. The Constitution of 1988, in Article 14, §3rd, item V, says that "Are conditions for eligibility: V - party affiliation." However, the Proposal Amendment to the Constitution (PEC) no. 6/2015, authored by independent senator José Reguffe, would allow the independent candidacy of individuals who have the support of at least 1% of the electors able to vote in the region (city, state or country, depending on the election) in which the candidate is running. Currently, members of the legislature can leave their respective parties after being elected, as in the case of senator Reguffe, who left the Democratic Labour Party (PDT) in 2016.

Canada

Federal politics
In Canadian federal politics, members of both the House of Commons and the Senate are permitted to hold office without being members of a political party. Candidates in federal elections who are not affiliated with a party have two options: independent or no affiliation. In the former case, they appear on the ballot with "Independent" following their name; in the second case, they appear with their name only. The two options are otherwise equivalent.

House of Commons
During the earliest Canadian Parliaments, a lack of coherent political identity among both the Liberal and Conservative parties is known to have led to Members of Parliament (MPs) occasionally demonstrating independence from their party by voting in line with the opposition. Commonly, the issues which caused these MPs to act independently were religious in nature. These tensions began to disperse over the course of the first ten Canadian parliaments as the major political parties began to form consistent identities and MPs began affiliating themselves with the parties they knew more closely shared their core values. This in turn increased cohesion between parties and MPs, and minimized the causes and motivations for MPs to act independently.

Most observers of the Canadian House of Commons in the 21st century have noted its incredibly high party discipline. Few MPs choose to vote against their party's official stance on any given piece of legislation. Between 2011 and 2013—the first two years of the 41st Canadian Parliament, following the 2011 Canadian federal election—the elected members of the governing Conservative Party voted as a unified group on 76% of all votes, while members of the Liberal Party did so on 90% of all votes, and members of the New Democratic Party (NDP) did so on 100% of votes. This unity further increased in subsequent years, as in the 42nd Parliament, following the 2015 election, the governing Liberal MPs voted identically on 99.6% of all votes, Conservative MPs on 99.5% of votes, and NDP MPs on 99.8% of votes. Thanks to this strong party discipline, it is uncommon to see politicians who are otherwise affiliated with any of the main political parties act independently of their party.

Though it is acceptable and accepted for politicians to serve as independent MPs, those who attempt to run as such often struggle to be elected without access to the resources of the major parties. As a result, there are seldom more than one or two independent MPs within modern Canadian Parliaments, with many who do sit as such being initially elected as a part of a major party before either leaving voluntarily or being removed. In the first year of the 44th Canadian Parliament, the House of Commons featured one sitting independent member: Kevin Vuong, from the Ontario electoral district, or riding, of Spadina—Fort York. Vuong had originally campaigned as a member of the Liberal Party during the 2021 federal election but was ejected from the party two days prior to the end of the vote due to controversy surrounding past allegations of sexual assault. Despite his removal from the Liberal Party, Vuong won the election for his riding and chose to hold on to his seat as an independent, though this decision was met with controversy because many voters had not known that the Liberals had expelled him before casting their votes. In 2022, Alain Rayes, MP for the Quebec riding of Richmond—Arthabaska, who had been elected as a Conservative MP in three successive general elections, resigned from its caucus to sit as an independent, becoming the second independent MP of the 44th Parliament.

Independent politicians have on occasion held considerable sway in the House of Commons of Canada in recent years, as Canada has been governed by successive minority governments (five of the seven that have been formed since the 2004 federal election) with independent MPs sometimes sharing in the balance of power.

 In 2004, Chuck Cadman was elected to the House as an independent MP representing the British Columbia riding of Surrey North. Cadman was first elected to represent the riding as a Reform member in the 1997 federal election and re-elected as a member of the Canadian Alliance, Reform's successor party, in the 2000 federal election. He sought the nomination for the Conservative Party (re-created in 2003 when the Alliance and Progressive Conservatives merged) for the 2004 election but was unsuccessful. He died in office in 2005.
 Independent André Arthur was elected in the Quebec riding of Portneuf—Jacques-Cartier in the 2006 federal election. He was the only independent to win a seat in that election; he was re-elected in the 2008 federal election. Arthur lost his seat in 2011.
 Bill Casey, the MP for the Nova Scotia riding of Cumberland—Colchester—Musquoduboit Valley, was expelled from the Conservative Party for voting against the 2007 budget. He also ran as an independent in 2008 and retained his seat with 69% of the vote. Casey resigned from the Commons in 2009, before the end of his mandate, but was elected in the same riding, renamed Cumberland—Colchester, as a Liberal in 2015. He sat in the House for the 42nd Parliament and did not seek re-election in 2019.
 In 2019, MP Jody Wilson-Raybould ran as an independent candidate in the riding of Vancouver Granville after being expelled from cabinet and the Liberal Party over the SNC-Lavalin affair. She was returned to Parliament with 32% of the vote. After sitting as an independent for the 43rd Parliament, Wilson-Raybould did not seek re-election in 2021.

Senate
While traditionally framed as an "independent body of sober second thought", appointments to the Senate of Canada prior to 2016 were commonly seen as highly partisan, with the majority of Canadian senators identifying themselves as members of either the Liberal or Conservative parties and serving within their party's caucus. As these have been the only two parties to ever form government in Canada, only the Liberal and Conservative parties had been able to appoint new senators. Because Canadian senators are appointed by the Governor General of Canada on the advice of the Prime Minister rather than being elected, senators were often accused of being appointed as a "reward" for service to the party in power, and once appointed, of simply repeating the points and positions of their counterparts in the House of Commons rather than acting as a means of truly independent policy review.

In 2014, as a response to growing public disapproval of the Senate and the perceived problems brought about by senator partisanship, Liberal Party leader Justin Trudeau made the decision to expel all Liberal senators from the Liberal Party caucus. Trudeau would go on to call for an overall elimination of partisanship in the Senate and pledged to end the practice of partisan appointments for senators and transition to a new system of merit-based appointments if elected Prime Minister.

Following the election of a Liberal majority government in 2015, the Independent Advisory Board for Senate Appointments was established with the goal of filling Senate vacancies through a selection process based on political knowledge, merit, and perceived ability to act independently of partisan affiliation. This push to remove partisan ties from the Senate resulted in the creation of the Independent Senators Group, a coalition of both newly appointed independent senators and formally partisan senators who had relinquished their formal party ties, alongside the also independent Canadian Senators Group and Progressive Senate Group. By 2018, the majority of Canadian Senators were officially independent, though some Liberal senators continued to remain affiliated with the political party despite no longer being permitted within the party caucus. Additionally, the Conservative Party elected not to remove its senators from the party caucus, and many Conservative Party senators kept their official partisan affiliations in public. During the 2019 federal election campaign, in response to reporters' questions, Conservative Party leader Andrew Scheer said that if his party were elected to form government and he became prime minister, he would reinstate the practice of partisan appointments to the Senate.

The efforts to increase senatorial independence have led some to argue the Senate has developed an increase of importance and power in the legislative process. As of 2021, it was found that Canadian senators were facing increasing pressure from lobbying groups on a variety of issues, suggesting the more independent Senate has a greater perceived influence over legislative issues. Additionally, following the appointment of senators through the Independent Advisory Board for Senate Appointments, there has been a noted increase in the number of amendments the Senate has proposed for legislation from the House of Commons. During the 42nd Parliament (2015–2019), the Senate attempted to amend 13 government bills, whereas during the 41st Parliament (2011–2015), it had attempted to amend only one government bill. The reformed Senate is noted as having proposed amendments on at least 20% of all legislation.

Criticism
Several observers and those involved with the Senate itself have criticized the Trudeau government for its attempted reforms, with most accusations centering around the belief that the new appointment process is biased towards those who are ideologically supportive of the Liberal Party's objectives. Remaining Conservative senators have accused the Independent Senators Group in particular as being "too quick to endorse bills from the Liberal government". Supporting this claim, a 2021 study found that members of the Independent Senators Group voted in favor of legislation proposed by the incumbent Liberal government more consistently than any other group within the Senate, including those still formally aligned to the Liberal Party. This was, however, among an overall trend in which all senators demonstrated lower levels of party loyalty, and as such its full implications are still unknown. The report also concluded that partisanship in Senate appointments was undeniably down when compared to the Senate prior to the reforms. It is generally thought that it will only be possible to judge the success of the attempted reforms accurately when a non-Liberal governments is elected to the House of Commons, at which point it can be observed if the noted trend in voting represents simple loyalty to the government, or loyalty to the Liberal Party.

Provincial and territorial politics
The territorial legislatures of the Northwest Territories and Nunavut are consensus governments with no political parties. All members sit as independents. There are a few independent members of the other provincial and territorial legislatures, which are similar in principle to the federal House of Commons; for example, in the 2009 British Columbia general election, independent candidate Vicki Huntington narrowly defeated incumbent Attorney General Wally Oppal in Delta South. In the 2019 Newfoundland and Labrador general election, two independent candidates were elected.

Costa Rica
Current laws in Costa Rica do not permit a citizen to run directly for any elected position as an independent without the representation of a political party. Any nomination must be made through a political party, due to the framework of the current legal system, in which the political parties have a monopoly on the nomination of candidates for elected positions according to the Electoral Code.

However, becoming an independent politician after being elected is protected by virtue of Article 25 of the Constitution of Costa Rica, which guarantees freedom of association and therefore any citizen cannot be forced to remain in a specific political party and can join any other political group. It is common in each legislative period for some deputies (term used for legislators) of the Legislative Assembly of Costa Rica to become independents, and this has also happened with the mayors of the municipalities of cantons.

Mexico
Jaime Heliodoro Rodríguez Calderón (born in 1957), sometimes referred to by his nickname "Bronco", is a Mexican politician and former governor for the northern state of Nuevo León and holds no political party affiliation. , he was elected Governor of Nuevo León, making history as the first independent candidate to win in the country.

United States

President
George Washington is the only U.S. president elected as an independent to date. Washington opposed the development of political parties, which had begun to solidify as the Federalist faction, centered around John Adams and Alexander Hamilton, and the Democratic-Republican faction, centered around Thomas Jefferson and James Madison. Washington feared that partisanship would eventually destroy the country, and famously warned against "the baneful effects of the spirit of party" in his 1796 Farewell Address.

John Tyler was expelled from the Whig Party in September 1841, and effectively remained an independent for the remainder of his presidency. He later returned to the Democratic Party and briefly sought re-election in 1844 as a Tyler Democrat, but withdrew over fear he would split the Democratic vote and give the election to Whig candidate Henry Clay.

Since 1900, notable candidates running as independents for U.S. president have included congressman John Anderson in 1980, billionaire entrepreneur Ross Perot in 1992 and 1996 (in 1996 under the newly founded Reform Party), former Green Party candidate Ralph Nader in the 1996 and 2000 elections, and "Never Trump" conservative candidate Evan McMullin in 2016. Out of all independent candidates since Washington, Perot performed the best, gaining no votes in the Electoral College but receiving 19 percent of the popular vote and, early in the election season, leading in polls against his opponents Bill Clinton and George H. W. Bush. Additionally, McMullin received 21 percent of the popular vote in his home state of Utah but received little support from the remainder of the country. Independent senator Bernie Sanders ran in the 2016 and 2020 Democratic Party presidential primaries, but ultimately did not appear on the ballot in the 2016 presidential election, though he did receive more than 5% of the vote as a write-in candidate in his home state of Vermont.

In 2008, Nader formed Independent Parties in New Mexico, Delaware, and elsewhere to gain ballot access in several states. Several other candidates for federal races, including Joe Lieberman (who created Connecticut for Lieberman), have pursued a similar strategy.

Governor
Illinois, Maine, Oregon, Rhode Island, Texas, and Alaska have elected formally independent candidates as governor: Illinois's first two governors, Shadrach Bond and Edward Coles; James B. Longley in 1974 as well as Angus King in 1994 and 1998 from Maine; Lincoln Chafee in 2010 from Rhode Island; Julius Meier in 1930 from Oregon; Sam Houston in 1859 from Texas; and Bill Walker in 2014 from Alaska. Lowell P. Weicker Jr. of Connecticut is sometimes mentioned as an independent governor, though this is not technically correct; he ran as an A Connecticut Party candidate (which gave him better ballot placement than an unaffiliated candidate would receive), defeating the Democratic and Republican nominees. Another former governor who is sometimes mentioned as an independent is Jesse Ventura, who actually ran as a member of the Reform Party's Minnesota affiliate, which later disaffiliated from the party and reverted to its original name, the Independence Party of Minnesota.

In 1971, State Senator Henry Howell of Virginia, a former Democrat, was elected lieutenant governor as an independent. Two years later, he campaigned for governor as an independent, but lost by 15,000 votes.

There were several unsuccessful independent gubernatorial candidates in 2006 who impacted their electoral races. In Maine, state legislator Barbara Merrill (formerly a Democrat) received 21% of the vote. In Texas, country music singer and mystery novelist Kinky Friedman received 12.43% of the vote, and State Comptroller Carole Keeton Strayhorn received 18.13%. Strayhorn and Friedman's presence in the race resulted in a splitting of the ballot four ways between themselves and the two major parties.

In 2010, Florida governor Charlie Crist left the Republican party and became an independent. (He later became a Democrat.) He left the Republicans because he did not want to run against former state house Speaker Marco Rubio in the Republican primary for the U.S. Senate election, preferring to run in the general. Rubio won the election, though Crist came in ahead of Democratic nominee Kendrick Meek.

In 2014, former Honolulu mayor Mufi Hannemann ran as an independent candidate for the governorship of the State of Hawaii after previously campaigning in the state's Democratic primary. As a result, Democratic candidate David Ige was elected as governor with a plurality of 49%.

Congress

Senate 
There have been several independents elected to the United States Senate throughout history. Notable examples include David Davis of Illinois (a former Republican) in the 19th century, and Harry F. Byrd Jr. of Virginia (who had been elected to his first term as a Democrat) in the 20th century. Some officials have been elected as members of a party but became independent while in office (without being elected as such), such as Wayne Morse of Oregon, who left the Republican party to become an independent, then joined the Democratic Party two years later. Nebraska senator George W. Norris was elected for four terms as a Republican before changing to an independent after the Republicans lost their majority in Congress in 1930. Norris won re-election as an independent in 1936, but later lost his final re-election attempt to Republican Kenneth S. Wherry in 1942. Vermont senator Jim Jeffords left the Republican Party to become an independent in 2001. Jeffords's change of party status was especially significant because it shifted the Senate composition from 50 to 50 between the Republicans and Democrats (with a Republican Vice President, Dick Cheney, who would presumably break all ties in favor of the Republicans), to 49 Republicans, 50 Democrats, and one Independent. Jeffords agreed to vote for Democratic control of the Senate in exchange for being appointed chairman of the Senate Environment and Public Works Committee, and the Democrats held control of the Senate until the 2002 elections, when the Republicans regained their majority. Jeffords retired at the end of his term in 2007. Dean Barkley of the Independence Party of Minnesota was appointed a day before the 2002 elections to fill the senate seat of Paul Wellstone who, while running for re-election, died weeks prior. Barkley refused to caucus with either party.

House of Representatives 
The United States House of Representatives has also seen a handful of independent members. Examples include Bernie Sanders of Vermont, Virgil Goode of Virginia, Frazier Reams of Ohio, Victor Berger of Wisconsin, and Justin Amash and Paul Mitchell of Michigan.

Longest serving 
Senator Bernie Sanders is the longest-serving independent member of Congress in American history. He was an independent member of the United States House of Representatives for Vermont-at-large from 1991 to 2007. In 2006, Sanders won the Senate seat being vacated by the retiring Jim Jeffords as an independent. Joe Lieberman is a former Democrat who, like Lowell P. Weicker Jr., ran under a third party (Connecticut for Lieberman Party) in the 2006 election. In 2006, Sanders and Lieberman were the only two victorious independent candidates for Congress, both caucusing with the Democrats. In 2012, Angus King was elected to the U.S. Senate as an Independent from Maine. , he has typically caucused with the Democrats.

States

Pennsylvania

House of Representatives 
Representative Mark Rozzi became the first independent Speaker of the Pennsylvania House of Representatives on January 3, 2023.

Asia

Azerbaijan
In Azerbaijan, there are many independent members of the National Assembly, such as Aytən Mustafayeva.

China

Hong Kong
More than half of Hong Kong's Legislative Council is made up of independents, or members whose political groups are represented by one sole member in the legislature. They are common in functional constituencies, and are not rare among geographical constituencies.

India
Independent candidates can contest elections on the basis of their personal appeal or to promote an ideology different from any party. Independents currently hold 6 seats in the Indian Parliament.

Israel
The only Israeli politician elected to the Knesset by his own was Shmuel Flatto-Sharon.

Malaysia
Independents have rarely been elected to the Dewan Rakyat and state legislative assemblies. In Malaysian elections, many independent candidates lose their election deposit because they had failed to secure at least 12.5% or one-eighth of the total votes cast. Independent Senators are quite rare.

In 2010, a group of independent MPs who were sacked from the People's Justice Party formed a political block called Konsensus Bebas. The members were Zahrain Mohamed Hashim (Bayan Baru), Wee Choo Keong (Wangsa Maju), Zulkifli Noordin (Kulim-Bandar Bharu), Tan Tee Beng (Nibong Tebal) and Mohsin Fadzli Samsuri (Bagan Serai). It did not last beyond the 12th General Elections.

, three independent MPs were elected in GE14, but later joining Pakatan Harapan (PKR), thus causing no representation for independent MP for that time. However, as of June 2018 and December 2018, the number increased to 13 independent Members of Parliament that now currently sit in the Dewan Rakyat as of December 2018.

At the same time in December 2018, almost all members from Sabah UMNO quit the party and became independent politicians.

Maszlee Malik quit Homeland Fighters' Party and became an independent MP fighting for education activist.

Dewan Negara (Senate)

Senators

Dewan Rakyat (House of Representatives)

Members of Parliament of the 15th Malaysian Parliament

Malaysian State Assembly Representatives

Sarawak State Legislative Assembly

North Korea
Parliamentary independent candidates: The system in place whither the DPRK allows for independent politicians to launch their own campaigns to gain a seat in parliament. The candidates however must be approved by the Fatherland Front, being the primary party of the DPRK. To cast votes to independent candidates the voting population must do so at independent voting stations.

Nearly all electoral systems currently in practice in the DPRK that exist on a local level are made up of mostly independent Candidates, as the Fatherland Front and other major party's primarily operate in the urban heartland of the DPRK. On the local level of North Korean elections, alliances between independent candidates is banned.

Nepal
In Nepal, there are some independent politician specially in local government. Independent politician and Rapper Balen Shah was elected as Mayor of Kathmandu with heavy votes. Similarly, Harka Sampang and Gopi Hamal were also elected as Mayor of some of the major cities like Dharan & Dhangadhi, respectively.

Pakistan
Pakistan also has independent politicians standing in elections. Pakistan's Parliament has General Elections, 2008 elected 30 Members. In the 2011 four candidates won seats in the National Assembly. In the 2013 General Election nine seats were won by independents.

Philippines

Ever since the first elections during the 1907 Philippine Assembly elections, independents have been allowed to participate and have won seats. On that first election, independents had the most members, behind the Nacionalista Party. When the Senate was first created, its first elections in 1916 also saw independents participating and winning one seat. In the Nacionalista landslide of 1941, the three independents were the only non-members of the Nacionalista Party to win in the House of Representatives; this was also the start of independents being shut out in the Senate. After independence was granted by the United States in 1946, the two-party system between the Nacionalistas and Liberal Party was established, with certain candidates who failed to get the nomination of either parties appearing on the ballot as "Independent Nacionalista" or "Independent Liberal", as the case may be. Independents not associated with any party were still able to participate and sporadically win elections. In the 1961 Philippine vice presidential election, independent Sergio Osmeña Jr. narrowly lost to Emmanuel Pelaez. The first breakthrough was in the 1967 Philippine Senate election was Magnolia Antonino widow of Gaudencio Antonino who died on election eve, won.

Ferdinand Marcos declared martial law in 1972, dissolved Congress, and promulgated a new constitution that led to the 1978 Philippine parliamentary election, where one independent won, independents also won in 1984. Marcos was overthrown after the 1986 People Power Revolution after he allegedly cheated in the 1986 Philippine presidential election. Corazon Aquino succeeded Marcos, and promulgated a new constitution that ushered in a multi-party system. Here, parties are not able to present full 12-person slates in Senate elections, thus necessitating inter-party cooperation, that included independents. The 1995 Philippine Senate election saw two independents winning: Juan Ponce Enrile (who later ran and lost the 1998 Philippine presidential election as independent) and Gregorio Honasan, who both teamed up to stage coups during the Aquino presidency. The 2001 EDSA Revolution increased the number of major candidates running as independents, with broadcaster Noli de Castro topping the Senate election. He was a guest candidate of the opposition Pwersa ng Masa coalition but he never joined their campaign rallies. In 2004, he ran as vice president as a guest candidate of the administration K-4 coalition and won with just under majority of the vote.

In the local level, former priest Eddie Panlilio was elected as governor of Pampanga in 2007, defeating two administration candidates. When Panlilio eventually transferred to the Liberal Party in time for the 2010 election, it was ruled that he was beaten in the 2007 election; in 2010, he was defeated.

In the 2010 House of Representatives elections, seven independents were elected, although all but two joined a political party after the elections. Independents can only run in district elections, and cannot participate in party-list elections as independents.

In contesting elections, independent candidates, while can spend as much as those with parties can under the law, they aren't able to tap in spending from a political party that nominated them.

Independent candidates are different from nonpartisan politicians; the former are elected in openly partisan elections, while the latter participate in nonpartisan elections such as barangay elections. Local legislatures may find itself with independent and nonpartisan members.

Taiwan
After the 2018 Taiwanese local elections, there is only one independent local head:
 Ko Wen-je, Mayor of Taipei.
In 2019, Ko Wen-je founded the Taiwan People's Party, so there is no independent local head at the moment.

Europe

Bulgaria
The President of Bulgaria Rumen Radev is an independent with support from the Bulgarian Socialist Party. Radev was elected in the 2016 presidential election. An independent politician can enter into parliament only if they gather enough votes to pass the 4% threshold, thus behaving like political parties. However they can be part of a civic quota of a given party. Civic quotas are lists of independents candidates, who are represented on a given party's electoral list, without directly joining the party. Every party has the capability to invite independent candidates into their lists, without forcing them to join the party itself.

Croatia
After an inconclusive election in 2015, Tihomir Orešković was named the first non-partisan Prime Minister of Croatia.

Estonia
All Estonian presidents are forced to retire from any political party they may be in.

Finland

Marshal C. G. E. Mannerheim, who served as the President of Finland from 1944 to 1946, did not want to be affiliated with any party. As the state regent/caretaker from December 1918 to July 1919, Mannerheim also stood as an independent in the July 1919 presidential election against the National Progressive's candidate Kaarlo Juho Ståhlberg, who won. Also, after serving six years on his first term as the 12th President of Finland in the National Coalition Party from 2012 to 2018, Sauli Niinistö was elected for his second term in 2018 after running as an independent candidate. Sauli Niinistö's status as an independent/non-partisan president has been attributed to his historical approval ratings and popularity, which stood at 90% favorable in July 2021 of which 52% said that Niinistö had handled the presidency "Very favorably".

France
In France, independent politicians are frequently categorised as sans étiquette ("without label") in municipal or district elections.

In the nineteenth-century and first half of the twentieth century, most French national politicians were independents. The first modern French political parties date from the early 1900s (foundation of Action Libérale and the Radical Party). The first legislation on political parties dates from 1911, though it was not until 1928 that parliamentarians were required to select a political party for the parliamentary register (either by formally joining a group, or by loosely working with one as an apparenté, or associate), and not until after 1945 that structured political parties came to dominate parliamentary work.

Once elected, independents tended to attach themselves to a parliamentary party. In some cases independent deputies banded together to form a technical group of their own. In 1932, for instance, there were four technical groups created: the left-of-centre Independent Left, with 12 deputies; the centre-right liberal Independents of the Left, with 26 deputies; the right-wing agrarian Independents for Economic, Social and Peasant Action, with six deputies; and the far-right monarchist Independent Group, with 12 deputies—these four technical groups thus accounted for one-tenth of deputies. In addition, the larger parliamentary parties, including the socialist SFIO, centre-left PRRRS, centre-right ARD and conservative FR all included a greater or lesser number of independents who sat with their group for parliamentary work (apparentés).

In 1920, Alexandre Millerand was elected president of the Republic under the banner "without label".

However, it is nowadays rare to have independent politicians at national level, if only because independents usually affiliate themselves to an existing political grouping. Noteworthy independents include José Bové in the 2007 presidential election. Emmanuel Macron was an independent politician as Minister, but formed his own party to stand in the 2017 presidential election.

From 2001 to 2008, "without label" was no longer used in the nomenclature of the Ministry of the Interior. Candidates and lists presenting themselves as "without label" are classified in DVG (various left), DVD (various right), DVC (various center) or AUT (other) according to their political sensitivity. Therefore, from 2008 onwards, the DIV (miscellaneous) or the LDIV code for the "miscellaneous" list has been created to group unclassifiable or categorical interests and, by default, mayors without a declared label claiming no political sensitivity, be it left, center or right. The AUT (other) grade replaces the DIV grade without changing its definition.

Georgia
Salome Zourabichvili won the 2018 Georgian presidential election as an independent candidate, becoming the first-ever female President of Georgia.

Germany
Joachim Gauck, President of Germany from March 2012 to March 2017 and the first Federal President without party affiliation, was to date the most prominent independent politician. In the German presidential election of 2010 he was the candidate of the Social Democrats and Greens, in 2012 the candidate of all major parties except The Left. His presidency—though his powers are limited—constitutes an exception, as Independent politicians have rarely held high office in German history, at least not since World War II. It has nevertheless happened that a presidential candidate without any chances of election by the Federal Convention was not a party member: for example, in 1984 the Greens came up with the writer Luise Rinser.

In the Bundestag parliament nearly all deputies belong to a political party. The voting system of personalized proportional representation (since 1949) allows any individual holding the passive right to vote to stand for a direct mandate in the electoral districts—299 of the seats in parliament are distributed by districts according to a plurality voting system. Such a candidate has to present 200 signatures in favor of their candidacy, the same as a candidate of a party that had no parliamentary presentation previously. The first Bundestag election in 1949 saw three independents elected; since then, no party-independent candidate has won a seat. At state level, the situation is more or less the same: only party members have a real chance to be elected to a Landtag legislature, and state ministers without party membership are just as rare as at the federal level. However, in local elections it may occur that an independent politician is elected deputy to districts', cities' and municipalities' assemblies, as well as member of a city council or even mayor, especially in Northern Germany. In recent years, independents have formed Free Voters associations which have had success in local governments. Two such associations have managed to enter state parliaments: the Free Voters of Bavaria in 2008 and the Brandenburg United Civic Movements/Free Voters in 2019.

An independent member of parliament, who also is not a member of a voters' association, holds the status of fraktionsloser Abgeordneter, i.e., not affiliated to any parliamentary group. A representative who either leaves their party (and their parliamentary group) or is expelled from it and does not join another becomes fraktionslos. In 1989 the Bundestag MP Thomas Wüppesahl, who had left the Green Party in 1987 and was excluded from the Green parliamentary group the next year, obtained more rights as a fraktionsloser Abgeordneter, for example more talking time and representation in a subcommittee, when the Federal Constitutional Court decided partially in their favor.

After the German unification of 1871, the first Reich Chancellors (heads of government) de jure served as executive officers of the German Imperial states as non-partisans, usually recruited from the traditional bureaucratic, aristocratic and/or military elites. In the fierce political conflicts during the Weimar period after World War I, several chancellors and Reich Ministers also had no party affiliation: these chancellors were Wilhelm Cuno (1922–1923), Hans Luther (1925–1926), the former Centre politician Franz von Papen (1932), and Kurt von Schleicher (1932–1933). The last two cabinets appointed by Reich President Paul von Hindenburg, a non-partisan (though strongly Conservative) himself, were regarded as apolitical cabinets of experts with regard to the rise of the Nazi Party; many of the ministers were not party members.

Since World War II, only two ministers of (West) German cabinets have not been party members, though "on the ticket" of the major party in the coalition, the Social Democrats: Education Minister Hans Leussink (1969–1972), and Minister of Economy Werner Müller (1998–2002). Minister of Justice Klaus Kinkel only shortly after his appointment joined the Free Democrats in 1991. A special case is the former Federal Minister and Chancellor Ludwig Erhard, whose affiliation with the Christian Democratic Union (CDU) has not been conclusively established: although he served as Minister of Economics from 1949 to 1963 and as Federal Chancellor from 1963 to 1966, and was even elected CDU party chairman in 1966, it seems that he never signed a membership form or paid contributions. Researches by Der Stern magazine have revealed a record at the CDU party archives created only in 1968, with the faked date of entry of early March 1949.

Iceland
The President of Iceland (currently Guðni Th. Jóhannesson) is independent.

Ireland

In Ireland, proportional representation, the comparative looseness of formal parties, and strong local sentiment have meant that independents have formed a significant part of the parliamentary landscape since the foundation of the state: in the early elections to Dáil Éireann (parliament), independents accounted for 7% of seats in 1922, 8.5% in 1923, 10.5% in 1927, and 9% in 1932, though with the development of relatively more structured parties their numbers declined thereafter. These were similar proportions to the number of independents elected to other interwar European democracies such as France (see above).

It was not until the 2010s that independents would see a similar electoral success, with record scores for independents surpassing the previous interwar highs.

After the Irish general election in 2016, there were 19 independent TDs (parliamentary deputies) in the Dáil (the lower house of the Irish parliament), representing 12% of the total. Two technical groups were formed by independent deputies to coordinate their activities: the Independents4Change, with four deputies, opposed the government, while the Independent Alliance formed part of the minority government's working majority. A number of other individual independents similarly supported the government, and received cabinet positions.

There are fourteen independent senators in the 25th Seanad (the upper house of the Irish parliament), representing 23% of the total. Three of these are elected by the graduates of the National University of Ireland and two from Dublin University. There are also five independent senators who were nominated by the Taoiseach and four elected by the technical panels.

Italy
The Prime Ministers Carlo Azeglio Ciampi (1993–1994), Lamberto Dini (1995–1996), Giuliano Amato (2000–2001), Mario Monti (2011–2013), Giuseppe Conte (2018–2021) and Mario Draghi (2021–2022) were independent when they were in office. Ciampi was also the President of Italy between 1999 and 2006. President Sergio Mattarella, despite being a former member of the Christian Democracy and of the Democratic Party, was elected president in 2015 as an independent (he was member of the Constitutional Court at the moment of his election).

Kosovo
Atifete Jahjaga was elected the first female and Independent President of Kosovo. She was also the first female and independent elected leader in the whole of the Balkans.

Poland
The Polish Sejm is elected by party-list ordination, which does not allow lone candidates to run, although since 2001 there has been a possibility to create non-partisan Voters' Electoral Committee (pol. KWW, komitet wyborczy wyborców); they are by almost any means party lists, but no officially registered party is behind them. They can be unregistered parties, e.g. Kukiz'15, or non-partisan movements, although the latter never reached the 5% threshold. National minorities candidates also form Voters' Electoral Committees (like German Minority Electoral Committee, represented in Sejm since 1991), but they do not have to reach the nationwide threshold. However, during a Sejm term many members switch parties or become independents.

Tickets such as Civic Platform during the 2001 election were formally non-partisan, Civic Platform was widely viewed as a de facto political party, as it is now.

The situation in the Senate is different, as the voting system allows independents to run as single candidates and some are elected in their own right. In the last parliamentary election (2015) four independents won seats in the Senate.

Three presidents since 1990 have technically been independents. Lech Wałęsa was not an endorsed candidate of any party, but the chairman of the Solidarity and he was elected without full support of this union (Solidarity votes split between him and Prime Minister Tadeusz Mazowiecki). Aleksander Kwaśniewski was a leader of the Social Democracy of the Republic of Poland, but formally resigned from the party after he was elected, as did Lech Kaczyński, who was the first leader of Law and Justice, Bronisław Komorowski (PO) and Andrzej Duda (PiS). The resignation is required because the Constitution says that the president shall hold no other offices nor discharge any public functions. The aforementioned presidents often participated in their party's campaigns (e.g. Andrzej Duda in the Law and Justice campaign three months after his resignation from the party).

Portugal
Marcelo Rebelo de Sousa, the current president of Portugal since 6 March 2016, was elected on 24 January 2016 while being a leading member of the Social Democratic Party, but suspended his political affiliation on the day of his swearing-in.

Russia
All of Russia's presidents have been independents. Former president Dmitry Medvedev declined an offer to join United Russia, saying that he believes the President should be an independent so that he serves the interests of the country rather than his political party.

Vladimir Putin, the current president of Russia, was the head of the United Russia party until 26 May 2012, but even then was not its member, thus formally was and still is independent.

Sweden
The Swedish election system is based on parties nominating candidate MPs for their party ballots, and each party has to receive 4% or more of the national vote (or 12% in one region, which has never happened independently of also reaching the different 4% threshold). This makes running as an independent MP impossible. Once elected, the seat is personal; MPs may resign their party membership, or be stripped of it, while retaining their Riksdag seats to become independent to become what is commonly referred to as a politisk vilde (political savage) symbol: (-).

In the Government (executive cabinet), there is no requirement for ministers to be MPs, or even have a political affiliation (though this has overwhelmingly been the case in modern times). This means that even the Prime Minister could technically be an independent if chosen by the Riksdag.

United Kingdom
The Registration of Political Parties Act 1998 laid down the first specific rules in the United Kingdom relating to the use of the term 'independent' by election candidates. That Act was repealed with most of its contents covered by Part II of the Political Parties, Elections and Referendums Act 2000. Candidates standing for United Kingdom local elections and United Kingdom parliamentary elections, including the devolved parliaments and assemblies, can use the name of a registered political party, or the term 'Independent' (or its Welsh language equivalent annibynol) or no ballot paper description at all (this latter choice was used, for example, by David Icke at the 2008 Haltemprice and Howden by-election).

Some groups in the United Kingdom who are not affiliated to any national or regional party have registered locality-based political parties. Some English examples are the Independent Kidderminster Hospital and Health Concern, the Epsom and Ewell Residents Association, the Devizes Guardians, the Derwentside Independents, and the East Yorkshire Independents.

House of Commons

Before the twentieth century it was fairly common for independents to be elected to the House of Commons of the United Kingdom, but there have been very few since 1945. S. O. Davies, a veteran Labour MP, held his Merthyr Tydfil seat in the 1970 general election, standing as an independent, after the Labour Party had deselected him.

Journalist Martin Bell was elected at Tatton in the general election of 1997, having stood on an anti-corruption platform, defeating incumbent Neil Hamilton. He was the first independent to be newly elected to the Commons since 1951. He stood unsuccessfully in a different constituency in 2001.

At the 2001 general election, Dr Richard Taylor of the Independent Kidderminster Hospital and Health Concern party was elected for the constituency of Wyre Forest. Taylor was re-elected for Wyre Forest at the 2005 general election, becoming the only independent in recent times to have been elected for a second term.

Two independent (or local party) members of parliament were elected in the 2005 election, although both were defeated five years later. In the same election, Peter Law was elected as an independent at Blaenau Gwent. Law died on 25 April 2006: the resulting by-election elected Dai Davies of the local party Blaenau Gwent People's Voice. The by-election was unusual as it was the first time in over eighty years that an independent had held a seat previously occupied by another independent.

Only one independent was elected to the Commons in the 2010, 2015 and 2017 elections: Sylvia Hermon, the member for North Down, a Unionist who left the Ulster Unionist Party because of its links with the Conservatives.

There have also been several instances of politicians being elected to the Commons as representatives of a political party, then resigning the party's whip, or having it withdrawn. Examples in this in the 2010–2015 parliament included Mike Hancock (formerly a Liberal Democrat), Eric Joyce (formerly Labour) and Nadine Dorries, a Conservative who had the whip withdrawn for part of the parliament and thus sat as an independent during that time.

Independent candidates often stand in British parliamentary elections, often with platforms about specific local issues, but usually without success. An example from the 2001 general election was Aston Villa supporter Ian Robinson, who stood as an independent in the Sutton Coldfield constituency in protest at the way chairman Doug Ellis ran the football club. Another example an independent candidate, in the Salisbury constituency, is Arthur Uther Pendragon, a local activist and self-declared reincarnation of King Arthur.

Other independent candidates are associated with a political party and may be former members of it, but cannot stand under its label. For instance, for several months after being expelled from the Labour Party but before the Respect Coalition was founded, George Galloway MP described himself as "Independent Labour".

On 23 March 2005 the Independent Network was set up to support independent candidates in the forthcoming General Election. The Independent Network still supports Independent candidates in local, regional, national and European elections. It has an organic set of principles which are known as the Bell Principles and are very closely related to Lord Nolan's Standards of Public Life. The Independent Network does not impose any ideology or political influence on their candidates.

In March 2009, the multi-millionaire Paul Judge established the Jury Team, an umbrella organisation dedicated to increasing the number of independent candidates standing in Britain, in both national and European elections.

Independent and undescribed candidates
Part II of the Political Parties, Elections and Referendums Act 2000 allows individuals who wish to stand as a candidate to all parliaments and assemblies in the UK, including the House of Commons, the right to use one of three ballot paper descriptions. Those descriptions are the name of a registered political party; the word "independent"; or no description at all.

Unless a candidate stands as "independent" or as a "No Description" candidate leaving the ballot paper description box blank, their candidature must be confirmed by a signed certificate from the relevant officer from a registered political party, as set out in Section 52 of the Electoral Administration Act 2006.

House of Lords

The House of Lords includes many peers independent from political parties. Some are simply not affiliated with any grouping, whilst another, larger, grouping is given the official designation of crossbenchers. Additionally the Lords Spiritual (bishops of the Church of England) do not have party affiliations.

Scottish Parliament, Senedd (Welsh Parliament) and Northern Irish Assembly
In the 2003 Scottish Parliamentary elections, three MSPs were elected as Independents: Dennis Canavan (Falkirk West), Dr Jean Turner (Strathkelvin and Bearsden) and Margo MacDonald (Lothians). In 2004 Campbell Martin (West of Scotland region) left the Scottish National Party to become an independent and in 2005 Brian Monteith (Mid Scotland and Fife) left the Conservative Party to become an independent. At the 2007 Scottish Parliamentary elections Margo MacDonald was again returned as an independent MSP and was elected as an independent for the third time four years later. She died in 2014 while still serving as member of the Parliament. As she was elected as an independent regional MSP, there could be no by-election and her seat remained vacant until the 2016 election.

Peter Law was expelled from the Labour Party after standing against an official Labour candidate in Blaenau Gwent at the 2005 UK general election and became an independent in the National Assembly and UK Parliament. In 2006 Peter Law died from a brain tumour and his wife, Trish Law, campaigned and took the seat as an independent candidate at the subsequent by-election and held onto the seat again in the 2007 Welsh Assembly elections.

In 2016, Nathan Gill as the then leader of UKIP Wales defected from the group to sit as an independent after a falling out with Neil Hamilton, who was elected UKIP Assembly group leader. Dafydd Elis-Thomas left the Plaid Cymru group later in 2016 after multiple fallings out with Plaid Cymru leader Leanne Wood. Elis-Thomas said his reason for leaving Plaid Cymru was that it not serious about working with the Welsh Labour Government. Neil McEvoy was expelled from Plaid Cymru on 16 January 2018 and sat as an independent AM until 2021. Nathan Gill stood down on 27 December 2017 and was replaced by Mandy Jones. Mandy Jones left the UKIP group on 9 January 2018 over a fallout over her staff.

Local elections
The introduction of directly elected mayors in several parts of England has witnessed the election of independents to run councils in Stoke-on-Trent, Middlesbrough, Bedford, Hartlepool and Mansfield. The first Mayor of London, Ken Livingstone, was first elected as an independent, having run against the official Labour candidate Frank Dobson. He was subsequently re-admitted to the Labour Party in December 2003 before his first re-election campaign.

Independent candidates frequently stand and are elected to local councils. There is a special Independent group of the Local Government Association to cater for them. A number of local authorities have been entirely or almost entirely composed of independent members, such as the City of London Corporation, the Isles of Scilly Council, Orkney Islands Council, Shetland Islands Council and Comhairle nan Eilean Siar (Western Isles Council) in the Outer Hebrides.

Roughly a quarter of the police and crime commissioners elected in England and Wales in the 2012 election were independents.

Oceania

Australia

Independents are a recurrent feature of the federal Parliament of Australia, and they are more commonly elected to state parliaments. There have been up to five independents in every federal parliament since 1990, and independents have won twenty-eight times during national elections in that time. A large proportion of independents are former members of one of Australia's four main parties, the Australian Labor Party, the Liberal Party of Australia, the Australian Greens, or the National Party of Australia. In 2013 a political party named the Australian Independents was registered with the Australian Electoral Commission.

At the dissolution of parliament before the 2019 federal election, four independents sat in the Australian House of Representatives: Andrew Wilkie (Member for Denison), Cathy McGowan (Member for Indi), Kerryn Phelps (Member for Wentworth), and Julia Banks (Member for Chisholm). Of these, Wilkie had previously been a Greens candidate, McGowan had been a Liberal staffer, and Banks was elected as a Liberal MP before resigning from the party in November 2018. At the 2019 election, Wilkie was re-elected as the Member for Clark, while McGowan retired, and both Phelps and Banks lost their seats. However, two new independents entered parliament: Zali Steggall (Member for Warringah) and Helen Haines (Member for Indi).

After the 2022 federal election, a record ten independents were elected to the House of Representatives, including re-elected members Andrew Wilkie (Clark), Zali Steggall (Warringah), and Helen Haines (Indi). Seven new independents were elected to the House of Representatives: Dai Le (Fowler), Zoe Daniel (Goldstein), Monique Ryan (Kooyong), Allegra Spender (Wentworth), Kate Chaney (Curtin), Kylea Tink (North Sydney), and Sophie Scamps (Mackellar). Several of the newly elected independents have been branded Teal independents, due to their use of the colour teal in campaigning material, similar policy platforms and support from Climate 200.

Independent senators are quite rare. In modern politics, Independent Brian Harradine served from 1975 to 2005 with considerable influence at times. Nick Xenophon was the only elected independent senator after his election to the Senate at the 2007 federal election and was re-elected for another six-year term at the 2013 federal election. He resigned from the Australian Senate in 2017 to contest a seat in the House of Assembly of South Australia. DLP Senator John Madigan became an independent senator in September 2014, but lost his seat in the 2016 election. PUP Senators Jacqui Lambie and Glenn Lazarus became Independent senators in November 2014 and March 2015 respectively. Lambie was re-elected in 2019 with the support of the Jacqui Lambie Network. At the 2022 Australian federal election, independent senator for the ACT David Pocock was elected, becoming the first independent senator from a territory.

New Zealand
Originally, there were no recognised parties in the New Zealand parliament, although loose groupings did exist informally (initially between supporters of central government versus provincial governments, and later between liberals and conservatives). The foundation of formal political parties, starting at the end of the 19th century, considerably diminished the number of unaffiliated politicians, although a smaller number of independent candidates continued to be elected up until the 1940s. Since then, however, there have been relatively few independent politicians in Parliament. No independent candidate has won or held a seat in a general election since 1943, although two independent candidates have been successful in by-elections (in all cases after having held the seats in question as partisan candidates up until that point). Other politicians have become independents in the course of a parliamentary term, but not been voted into office as such.

By the time of the next general election, he had formed his own party (New Zealand First), and thus was no longer standing as an independent. Since that time, the only independents in Parliament have been people who quit or were expelled from their original party but retained their seats without going through a by-election. Some have gone on to found or co-found their own parties, with varying levels of success—examples include Peter Dunne, Taito Phillip Field, Gordon Copeland, Tau Henare, and Alamein Kopu. Others have joined parties which were then outside Parliament, such as Frank Grover and Tuariki Delamere.

There were two independent MPs in the 49th New Zealand Parliament: Chris Carter and Hone Harawira. Carter became an independent after his criticisms of the Labour Party's leadership resulted in his being expelled from the Labour caucus, while Harawira resigned from the Māori Party and, after a short period as an independent, also resigned as an MP in order to force the  when he was re-elected as representative of his new political party, Mana and retained the seat in the 2011 General Election. There were also two other parties which had only a single MP: United Future with Peter Dunne and ACT with David Seymour. In the 50th New Zealand Parliament there was one independent MP: Brendan Horan, a former New Zealand First MP who was expelled from his party because of allegations of misappropriation of family assets.

Peter Dunne effectively became an Independent MP for a short period after his United Future political party was deregistered on 25 June 2013 by the Electoral Commission, as the party no longer had the required minimum of 500 members. The party was subsequently re-registered two months later.

Niue
In Niue, there have been no political parties since 2003, when the Niue People's Party disbanded, and all politicians are de facto independents. The government depends on an informal coalition.

See also

 Nonpartisanism
 Party switching
 Backbencher
 Centrism
 Electoral reform
 Benjamin Franklin
 Independent voter
 Non-partisan democracy
 Radical centrism
 Swing vote
 Syncretic politics
 Third party (United States)

Notes

References

External links
 Independent Political Candidate Directory

 
Political terminology